Reformed Youth Movement (RYM) is a non-denominational junior and senior high conference located in Florida, Colorado and Oregon in the United States for students (the name refers to its origin in the Calvinist tradition). Such students are typically from a Protestant Evangelical background.  RYM was started in 1972 with about 120 students and now serves nearly 2,000 students.  RYM is a non-profit organization run by 17 board members who are pastors from around the United States. Kurt Cooper is the CEO and Drew Turberville is the official mascot.

External links
RYM Online (official website)
Sermons on RYM Online

Christian youth organizations
Christian organizations established in 1972
Youth organizations based in the United States